The Tibbetts Award ("Tibbie") is a national award made annually to those small firms, projects, organizations, and individuals judged to exemplify the very best in Small Business Innovation Research (SBIR) achievement.  The award was established in 1995 and the first awards were made in 1996. The award was named after Roland Tibbetts of the National Science Foundation.

Tibbetts Awards recognize accomplishments where, in the judgement of those closely involved and often most immediately affected, the stimulus of SBIR funding has made an important and definable difference.

Selection
In selection for Tibbetts Awards, the focus is primarily on:

 Economic impact of technological innovation
 Business achievement and effective collaborations
 Demonstrated state and regional impact and proven support

Tibbetts "Hall of Fame" awards were first presented in 2011, to recognize small businesses that "exemplify notable lifetime achievement in innovation research and that have achieved extraordinary success as a result of the SBIR program."

Hiatus and return
In 2007 the Tibbetts award went on hiatus and was not awarded for the years 2008, 2009, and 2010.  In 2011, forty-four companies and eight individuals were selected to receive the award.  Tibbets Awards were awarded to businesses ranging from medical device companies such as MedShape Solutions, to electronics manufacturers such as Qualcomm, Inc, and to nanobiotechnology companies such as ANP Technologies.

About the SBIR Program

The SBIR program awards United States Federal Government funds to small businesses to develop innovative technologies that address important national priorities.  Individual agencies set aside a fraction of their research and development funds for the program and competitively award contracts to those firms that propose the best strategies to solve solicitation topics.  The topics are chosen to address technical issues that each agency considers important.
Roland Tibbetts began the SBIR program as a tiny experimental project at the National Science Foundation. Today, the SBIR program has developed more than $21 billion worth of research by more than 15,000 firms—resulting in more than 45,000 patents. SBIR companies employ more than 400,000 scientists and engineers—making the program the largest concentration of scientific and engineering talent in the United States, exceeding the combined total of all American academic and non-profit institutions. Each year, 11 federal agencies award $2 billion in research contracts as part of the SBIR program.

Past winners

2016

2015

2014

2013

2011

2010

2007

2006

1998

References

Awards established in 1998
American awards